Dawit Fekadu (Amharic:ዳዊት ፍቃዱ)  is an Ethiopian professional footballer, who plays as a forward for Welwalo Adigrat University F.C. in the Ethiopian Premier League. He formerly played with Dedebit F.C.

International career
In January 2014, coach Sewnet Bishaw, invited him to be a part of the Ethiopia squad for the 2014 African Nations Championship. The team was eliminated in the group stages after losing to Congo, Libya and Ghana.

International goals
Scores and results list Ethiopia's goal tally first.

References

Living people
Ethiopian footballers
Ethiopia A' international footballers
2014 African Nations Championship players
1986 births
Place of birth missing (living people)
Association football forwards
Ethiopia international footballers